This article describes the history of Sweden from the late 1960s until 1991.

Rise of the far left
During the mid-sixties, there was a strong wave of radical leftism in Sweden, sometimes precipitating heavily publicized events like the Båstad riots and the occupation of the student union building at Stockholm University - though never causing actual fatalities, in either street fighting or domestic political terror acts, as it did in Western Germany and Italy during these years.

"Solidarity" and "awareness" became watchwords, first in literary and student circles, then in the socialist/syndicalist underground, and finally, in the media and the government. By the early seventies, people and government, led by Prime Minister Olof Palme (s), rose in protest against oppression and war in countries as distant as South Africa and Vietnam (at the end of 1972, Palme famously indicted the American shock bombings of Hanoi and compared them to Nazi war crimes such as the destructions of Lidice and Oradour; the USA responded by calling home her ambassador).  The Swedish support for the ANC in and outside of South Africa and FNL and the Hanoi government in the Vietnam war were steady not only in words, popular support and help to enter the diplomatic arena, but also in economic (though not military) state subsidies. After Vietnam was reunited in 1975, for instance, Sweden supported the construction of a modern pulp plant at Bai Bang.

In 1973, journalists Jan Guillou and Peter Bratt exposed Informationsbyrån, a secret agency operating with some assistance of military personnel, but not a part of the military intelligence and not formally run by the military. One of its aims was to gather intelligence on communists and other people regarded as dangerous to national security. While the existence of such a thing, and in particular of its implied links to the Social Democratic party structure, was fiercely denied, the question continued to surface in a number of political scandals over the years, until it became the subject of serious historical discussion, a few state-issued retrospective white papers and political recant. Although some details are a bit hazy (including when and how it began) this "internal spying" outside of the ordinary state intelligence services, is now considered an established fact. IB in the form unraveled by Guillou and Bratt did not operate, it seems, beyond the mid-seventies.

The constitutional practice was changed several times during this decade. In 1971 the Riksdag became unicameral. By the new constitution of 1974 the monarch was divorced from all power of political intervention on their own, the end-point of an evolution that had been going on ever since the early years of the century. There have been no real attempts to abolish formal monarchy, though.

Environmentalism and nuclear power

The 1970s and '80s saw a rise in environmentalism – the ambiguous result of a referendum in 1980 advised government to phase out Swedish nuclear power by the year of 2010. The Chernobyl disaster in 1986 caused considerable radioactive fallout over Sweden. With only the Barsebäck nuclear power plant permanently closed, and ten out of twelve reactors still running (as of 2007), this schedule was no longer regarded as realistic, and in the 2006 elections the liberal (Folkpartiet) and the Moderate Party supported not only reversing the decision but building a few fresh nuclear plants. The Green Party was founded in 1981, entered the Riksdag in 1988 and supported Göran Persson's Social Democratic government from 1998 to 2006.

Right-wing intermission
The 1976 parliamentary elections brought a liberal/right-wing coalition to power after almost half a century of social democrat leadership, and Mr Palme gave way to Thorbjörn Fälldin (of the Centre Party, a former farmers/landowners party which had incorporated social liberal ideas as well as the burgeoning environmental debate). Over the next six years, four governments ruled and fell, composed by all or some of the parties that had won in 1976, and the questions of energy and of battling the economic recession came to the fore. The fourth liberal government in these years, again with Fälldin at the helm, seemed somewhat baffled by these problems and had neither the support of a firm majority in the parliament, nor a clear mandate from the non-socialist part of the Swedish electorate. Predictably it came under fire both from the Social Democrats and trade unions, and from the Moderate Party, now heading in an increasingly Friedman-inspired and market liberal direction, and it was defeated in the elections of 1982, with Mr. Palme returning to the PM's seat.

During the 1980s there were several incidents of foreign, probably Soviet, submarines violating the Swedish territorial borders. In late 1981 the Soviet submarine U 137 ran ashore inside a restricted zone off the Karlskrona naval base, and became headline news. Though the particular fact was kept secret at the time, nuclear activity, probably from torpedo warheads was detected on board and reported to PM Fälldin while the vessel was still stuck in the firth. The incident marked a turning-point both in Soviet-Swedish relations and in the discussion in Sweden about defence, the Soviet Union and ultimately the place of Sweden in the arena of the Cold War.

Assassination of Olof Palme

On February 28, 1986, Prime Minister Palme was murdered as he was walking the streets of Stockholm with his wife. The crime came as a shock—indeed it is sometimes referred to as a national trauma, or an event by which Sweden "lost her innocence". The main suspect Christer Pettersson was convicted of the murder, but the conviction was reversed on appeal because the gun was never found.  Pettersson died in 2004.

Palme was succeeded by his deputy Ingvar Carlsson.

References

1967
1967
Sweden

sv:Sveriges historia 1968-1991